The English Open was a professional golf tournament held in England. First played in 1988, it was an annual event on the European Tour until 2002. After several aborted attempts at reviving the tournament, it returned to the tour schedule in 2021, when it was titled as the Cazoo Classic.

Winners of the tournament include some of the most successful players in European Tour history including Mark James, Ian Woosnam, Colin Montgomerie, Lee Westwood and Darren Clarke. James and Clarke are the only two players to have won the title more than once.

History
In most countries where golf is played there is a national open, but in England this role was effectively filled by The Open Championship, sometimes referred to as the "British Open". The English Open was founded in 1988, replacing the Lawrence Batley International on the tour schedule, and despite initial sponsorship issues, there were hopes that the new English Open would develop into another major national open on the circuit.

After the first event, which was held at Royal Birkdale, the Brabazon course at The Belfry was home to the tournament until 1993, when it moved to the Forest of Arden. It was then played at Hanbury Manor between 1997 and 1999, before returning to the Forest of Arden until the tournament was cancelled following the 2002 season as part of long-term plans for the European Tour to expand globally, by reducing the number of tournaments held in Europe, especially the United Kingdom. In the tour's first official season in 1972 12 out of 20 events were staged in the UK; by 1988 the ratio was 11 to 15, but by 2005 this was down to 8 out of 47.

After a six-year hiatus the English Open was due to return to the European Tour schedule in 2009. A five-year deal with the tour had been agreed, with the tournament being played over the Jack Nicklaus designed Signature Course at the St. Mellion International Resort in Cornwall, initially an alternate event to the PGA Championship, one of professional golf's majors. However early in 2009, the revival was postponed until 2011 at the earliest, after developers ran into financial problems, reportedly as a result of the ongoing recession. In March 2011 it was announced that the event had been cancelled due to insufficient sponsorship revenue having been raised by the organisers.

The tournament was due to return in 2020 as part of a revamp of the European Tour's schedule in the wake of the COVID-19 pandemic. The event was played at Forest of Arden Hotel and Country Club as part of a 6-week "UK Swing". When Hero MotoCorp agreed to sponsor of the scheduled event in July 2020, it was renamed as the Hero Open, and later separated historically from the English Open.

The English Open did return in 2021, however a sponsorship agreement with Cazoo saw the tournament renamed as the Cazoo Classic. Cazoo's multi-year partnership with the tour also included title sponsorship of the Wales Open.

Winners

See also
English Classic
Hero Open

References

External links
Coverage on the European Tour's official site

Former European Tour events
Golf tournaments in England
1988 establishments in England
Recurring sporting events established in 1988